Belgirallus is a genus of prehistoric rail that existed in Belgium during the Oligocene.

References

Prehistoric bird genera
Prehistoric birds of Europe
Fossil taxa described in 2001
Birds described in 2001
Rallidae